Calvary United Methodist Church at 971 Beech Avenue in the Allegheny West neighborhood of Pittsburgh, Pennsylvania, was built from 1892 to 1895.  This Gothic Revival styled Methodist church was designed by architects Vrydaugh and Shepherd, with T. B. Wolfe.  It was added to the List of Pittsburgh History and Landmarks Foundation Historic Landmarks in 1972, and the List of City of Pittsburgh historic designations on February 22, 1977.

References

Churches in Pittsburgh
Churches completed in 1895
19th-century Methodist church buildings in the United States
Gothic Revival church buildings in Pennsylvania
Methodist churches in Pennsylvania